Three Men in a Boat (To Say Nothing of the Dog) is a 1979 Soviet two-part musical-comedy miniseries directed by Naum Birman and based on the eponymous 1889 novel by Jerome K. Jerome.

Plot
Three friends: J, Harris and George, tired of idleness and wanting to correct their ill health, decide to go on a boat trip along the Thames. Together they take the fox terrier Montmorency. Before their journey, they agree to travel without females. But almost immediately on the road they meet three women going the same way as themselves: Anne, Emily and Patricia. First, the heroes try to keep their agreement, but then fall in love with these women and the women fall in love back with them. In the finale they are already three couples in love.

In the final episode of the film it is understood that Jerome K. Jerome invented his friends and the whole story from loneliness.

Cast
Andrei Mironov - Jerome K. Jerome / J. / Mrs. Baikli (1 series) / Uncle Podger (ibid.) / Innkeeper (2 series) / visitor to the inn (ibid.)
Alexander Schirvindt - Sir Samuel William Harris
Mikhail Derzhavin - George (voiced by Igor Efimov)
Larisa Golubkina - Anne
Alina Pokrovskaya - Emily
Irina Mazurkiewicz - Patricia
Zinovy Gerdt - the gravedigger (1 series)
Nikolai Boyarsky - 1st Grenadier (ibid.)
Grigory Shpigel - 2nd Grenadier (ibid.)
Yuri Katin-Yartsev - 3rd Grenadier (ibid.)
Anna Lisyanskaya - the hostess of the salon, whom the performance of comic songs leaves without guests (ibid.)
George Shtil - mustachioed captain
Tatyana Pelttser - Mrs. Poppits, the landlady
Fox Terriers "Duke" and "Sin" - Montmorency

References

External links

Russian comedy films
Soviet comedy films
Soviet television miniseries
Films based on works by Jerome K. Jerome
1970s television miniseries
1979 comedy films
1970s Russian-language films